The Central Europe Rally is a European rally competition scheduled to be debut in  as part of the World Rally Championship, co-hosted between Germany, Austria and Czech Republic. The rally would be based out of southeast Germany, in the city of Passau in Bavaria, and is set to run on tarmac.

References

External links

 
2023 establishments in Austria
2023 establishments in Germany
2023 establishments in the Czech Republic
Recurring sporting events established in 2023
Central Europe